Manchester City Council elections are generally held three years out of every four, with a third of the council being elected each time. Manchester City Council is the local authority for the metropolitan borough of Manchester in Greater Manchester, England. Since the last boundary changes in 2018, 96 councillors have been elected from 32 wards.

Political control
From 1889 to 1974 Manchester was a county borough, independent of any county council. Under the Local Government Act 1972 it had its territory slightly enlarged, gaining the parish of Ringway from Cheshire, whilst having its functions and responsibilities reformed, becoming a metropolitan borough, with Greater Manchester County Council providing county-level services. The first election to the reconstituted city council was held in 1973, initially operating as a shadow authority before coming into its revised powers on 1 April 1974. Greater Manchester County Council was abolished in 1986 and Manchester became a unitary authority. The Labour Party has held a majority of the seats on the city council since the reforms of 1974:

County Borough

Metropolitan Borough

Leadership
The leaders of the council since 1974 have been:

Council elections

Summary of the council composition after council elections, click on the year for full details of each election. Boundary changes took place for the 2004 election which reduced the number of seats by 3, leading to the whole council being elected in that year.

Borough result maps

By-election results

See also

:Category:Councillors in Manchester – list of councillors serving on Manchester City Council
Politics in Manchester

References

External links
Manchester City Council

 
Council elections in Greater Manchester
Local government in Manchester

Manchester